David Charles Michael Carter (born November 4, 1981) is a Canadian field hockey player who is the goalie for the Canada men's national field hockey team. He made his international debut on home soil against Chile in 2007 and registered a 1–1 draw.   His first career win came at the Azlan Shah Cup Tournament in Malaysia against Belgium (4–3, extra-time) in 2008.  Carter currently has 122 international caps and has represented Canada at the 2009 Pan American Cup, 2010 World Cup, 2010 Commonwealth Games, and 2011 Pan American Games alongside various other international competitions.  After playing for the UBC Thunderbirds for 5 years,  Carter currently plays for the United Brothers of the Vancouver Premier League. Carter was selected Goaltender of the Tournament for the 2009 Pan American Cup which qualified Canada for the 2010 World Cup to be held in New Delhi, India.  He was also selected to the Pan American Elite Team in 2009.
Instrumental in helping Canada qualify for the Rio Olympics in 2016, Carter was named both Player of the Tournament and Goalie of the Tournament at the World League Round 3 Event in Buenos Aires,  Argentina.  At the event Canada defeated New Zealand in a 14 round shootout after regulation time ended 0-0, where Carter was called upon to make multiple saves in the quarterfinal match up.   He then achieved a silver medal in the 2015 Pan American Games in Toronto and was then nominated for FIH Goalie of the Year.  In 2015 he wads named Field Hockey Canada Player of the Year and another selection to the Pan American Elite Team.

In 2016, he was named to Canada's Olympic team. In June 2019, he was selected in the Canada squad for the 2019 Pan American Games. They won the silver medal after losing 5–2 to Argentina in the final.

References

External links
 
David Carter at Field Hockey Canada
David Carter at the 2015 Pan American Games

1981 births
Living people
Canadian male field hockey players
Male field hockey goalkeepers
2010 Men's Hockey World Cup players
2018 Men's Hockey World Cup players
Field hockey players at the 2011 Pan American Games
Field hockey players at the 2014 Commonwealth Games
Commonwealth Games competitors for Canada
Field hockey players at the 2015 Pan American Games
Field hockey players at the 2019 Pan American Games
University of British Columbia alumni
Field hockey players at the 2016 Summer Olympics
Olympic field hockey players of Canada
Pan American Games silver medalists for Canada
Field hockey players from Vancouver
Pan American Games medalists in field hockey
Medalists at the 2011 Pan American Games
Medalists at the 2015 Pan American Games
Medalists at the 2019 Pan American Games